Patricia Megens-Libregts (born February 22, 1966 in Rotterdam, South Holland) is a retired water polo player from the Netherlands. She made her debut for the Women's National Team in 1984, and was on the squad that won the first official European title in women's water polo in 1985.

She competed for her native country at the 2000 Summer Olympics in Sydney, Australia, finishing in fourth place. Her biggest success came in 1991, when the Dutch won the world title, defeating Canada in the final. She is the mother of current national team-member Maud Megens and a daughter of former football (soccer) coach Thijs Libregts.

See also
 List of world champions in women's water polo
 List of World Aquatics Championships medalists in water polo

References

External links
 

1966 births
Living people
Dutch female water polo players
Water polo players at the 2000 Summer Olympics
Olympic water polo players of the Netherlands
Sportspeople from Rotterdam
World Aquatics Championships medalists in water polo